The 2008 Norwich City Council election took place on 1 May 2008 to elect members of Norwich City Council in England. One third of seats were up for election. This was on the same day as other local elections.

The Green Party won the most votes across Norwich for the first time, and won a plurality of the seats up for election. This marked the first time that the Greens had won a plurality of the votes and seats in a local authority election. It is also, to date, the last time that the Greens won the most seats or votes in a Norwich City Council election.

However, as only 13 of 39 council seats were up for election, Labour remained the largest party.

The 2008 election is, to date, the last election to see any member of the Conservative Party elected to Norwich City Council.

All changes in vote share are calculated with reference to the 2004 election, the last time these seats were contested.

Election result

|- style="background-color:#F6F6F6"
| colspan="7" style="text-align: right; margin-right: 0.5em" | Turnout
| style="text-align: right; margin-right: 0.5em" | 35.5
| style="text-align: right; margin-right: 0.5em" | 35,057
| style="text-align: right; margin-right: 0.5em" | 
|-

Changes in vote share are relative to the last time these seats were contested in 2004.

Council Composition

Prior to the election the composition of the council was:

After the election, the composition of the council was:

Ward results

Bowthorpe

Catton Grove

Crome

Eaton

Lakenham

Mancroft

Mile Cross

Nelson

Sewell

Thorpe Hamlet

Town Close

University

Wensum

References 

2008 English local elections
2008
2000s in Norfolk